Lodovico Domenichi (1515–1564) was an Italian translator.

Biography
Lodovico Domenichi was born in Piacenza (Italy) in 1515. After studying Law at the University of Padua, he pursued a literary career. He lived in Piacenza, Venice and Florence. He was renowned for his editions and translations of classical authors, including Xenophon, Plutarch, Polybius, and Pliny the Elder. He also authored the first Italian translation of the Letter of Aristeas. Dominichi died in Pisa, Tuscany (Italy) on August 29, 1564.

Works

I Fatti de Greci, di Senofonte, isette, libri di Senofone delia impresa di Ciro (Venice: Giolito, 1547, 1548, 1558)
Polibio historio greco (Venice: Giolito, 1545, 1553)
Historia naturale di G. Plinio secundo (Venice: Giolito, 1561)
Severino Boczio de Conforti filosofici (Florence: Torrentino, 1550; Venice: Giolito, 1562)
Istorie del suo tempo di Paolo Giovio (Florence: Torrentino, 1531, 1553)
Le Vite di Léon X e di Adriano VI pontefeci, e del cardinale Pompeo Colonna, del medesimo Paolo Giorno (Florence: Torrentino, 1549)
La nobiltà delle donne (Venice: Giolito, 1549/1551)
Aristea de settanta due interpreti (Florence: Torrentino, 1550)

References

"Lodovico Domenichi", in Louis-Gabriel Michaud, Biographie universelle ancienne et moderne, 2nd ed., 1843-65.

External links
 
 Querelle | Lodovico Domenichi Querelle.ca is a website devoted to the works of authors contributing to the pro-woman side of the querelle des femmes.
 

1515 births
1564 deaths
Greek–Italian translators
People from Piacenza
16th-century Italian writers
Latin–Italian translators